Hajde da se volimo (Let's Fall in Love) is the seventh studio album by Yugoslavian pop-folk singer Lepa Brena and her band Slatki Greh. It was released 24 October 1987 through the record label Diskoton.

This was her eighth of twelve albums with Slatki Greh and was the soundtrack for the film with the same name (released 20 November 1987). Scenes from the musical film were later used as music videos.

In 1988, Lepa Brena recorded an English version of the song "Hajde da se volimo" under the title "Let's Fall in Love".

The biggest hits on the album were songs "Hajde da se volimo", "Sanjam", "Udri mujo", "Učenici" and the ballad "Evo, zima će".

This album sold 850,000 copies.

Track listing

Personnel

Production and recording
Tahir Durkalić – engineering
Vladimir Negovanović – engineering
Zoran Radetić – engineering

Crew
Nedim Bačvić – design
Aleksandar Cvetinovski – photography

References

1987 albums
Lepa Brena albums
Diskoton albums
Serbo-Croatian language albums